High Halden Road is a disused railway station on the defunct Kent and East Sussex Railway which closed in 1954. The station building and platform still survives as farm offices beside the A262 road.

References

External links
 High Halden Road railway station at Disused-Stations.org.uk

Disused railway stations in Kent
Former Kent and East Sussex Railway stations
Railway stations in Great Britain opened in 1905
Railway stations in Great Britain closed in 1954